Festivaletteratura is a literary festival, held in Mantua, Italy, since 1997. Its peculiar formula is to host five days of small-sized lectures by authors from all over the world. The event is run mostly by volunteers, numbering around 700 in total. The lectures are hosted in historical places and squares, and during the five days of the fair there are about two hundred events. The low-profile style has in time attracted many big names of literature, along with Nobel Prize winners. The attendance to the events roughly matches the population of the city, so it is necessary to book tickets well in advance. In 2007, the fair celebrated its tenth edition.

The 2005 fair was the set for the 2005 Tinto Brass movie Monamour, in which it was depicted the peculiarity of the exhibit. The 2011 edition had seen for the first time the public exposition of the   Lovers of Valdaro.

See also
Mantua
Monamour
Lovers of Valdaro
Virgilio

References

External links 

Festivaletteratura homepage

Literary festivals in Italy
Festivals established in 1997
1997 establishments in Italy